The Doon River is a river in the Southland Region of New Zealand. It arises near Mount Donald and flows south-east into the south-west arm of Lake Te Anau.

The river was explored by Quintin McPherson McKinnon and G. Tucker in 1887.

See also
List of rivers of New Zealand

References

Land Information New Zealand - Search for Place Names

Rivers of Fiordland